Fustel may refer to:
 Numa Denis Fustel de Coulanges (1830–1889), a French historian
 an alternative name for fisetin, a flavonol